Sabin Adrian Moldovan (born 16 March 1999) is a Romanian professional footballer who plays as a forward for Metalul Buzău.

Honours
Unirea Slobozia
Liga III: 2019–20

References

External links
 
 

1999 births
Living people
Sportspeople from Iași
Romanian footballers
Association football forwards
Liga I players
Liga II players
Liga III players
FC Politehnica Iași (2010) players
LPS HD Clinceni players
AFC Unirea Slobozia players
CSM Ceahlăul Piatra Neamț players